Verbascum boerhavii, the annual mullein, is a species of flowering plant in the family Scrophulariaceae, native to Spain (including the Balearic Islands), France (including Corsica), and Italy. It has been traditionally used as a treatment for haemorrhoids. It contains the phenylpropanoid glycoside poliumoside, which has an affinity for metalloproteinases.

References

boerhavii
Flora of Spain
Flora of the Balearic Islands
Flora of France
Flora of Corsica
Flora of Italy
Taxa named by Carl Linnaeus
Plants described in 1767